The 2019 NCAA Division I Women's Swimming and Diving Championships were contested from March 20–23, 2019 at the Lee and Joe Jamail Texas Swimming Center at University of Texas at Austin in Austin, Texas at the 38th annual NCAA-sanctioned swim meet to determine the team and individual national champions of Division I women's collegiate swimming and diving in the United States.

Team standings

Note: Top 10 only
(H) = Hosts
(DC) = Defending champions
Full results

Swimming Results

See also
List of college swimming and diving teams

References

NCAA Division I Women's Swimming and Diving Championships
NCAA Division I Swimming And Diving Championships